Victor Harold Matthews (born 13 November 1950) is an American Old Testament scholar. He is Dean of the College of Humanities and Public Affairs and professor of religious studies at Missouri State University.

Matthews was born in Joplin, Missouri. He obtained a PhD at Brandeis University. In 2015, the fourth edition of Matthews' book, The Cultural World of the Bible, was published.

Work

Stephen Pattison notes that Matthews "has led the paradigm shift on shame issues" in Old Testament studies.

Publications

Books

Articles and chapters

References

Living people
1950 births
American biblical scholars
Old Testament scholars
Brandeis University alumni
Missouri State University faculty
People from Joplin, Missouri